Paisley Museum and Art Galleries is currently closed for refurbishment and is due to reopen 2024. It is a museum and public art gallery located in the town of Paisley and is run by Renfrewshire Council. It houses one of the largest municipal art collections in Scotland, including over 800 paintings.

The Museum and Art Galleries were gifted to the town of Paisley by the industrialist Sir Peter Coats in 1871. The building, which also houses Paisley Library and the Coats Observatory, was designed by Glasgow architect John Honeyman of the firm of Honeyman and Keppie. The first curator of the Museum was the entomologist Morris Young who remained in post until his death in 1897 leaving the Museum a bequest of £500 to be invested and the returns used to pay for the upkeep of the entomological collections and all his books. The museum has been extended on several occasions since it opened. There are plans for a revamp of the Museum to transform it into an "international-class destination" based around the Paisley's heritage story.

The art collection concentrates largely on works by late nineteenth-century and early twentieth-century Scottish artists,  such as the Glasgow School and the Scottish Colourists. In addition there is a contemporary collection which includes work by artists such as Steven Campbell and John Byrne, who was born in Paisley.

The museum houses a collection of objects and documents covering the local history of Paisley and Renfrewshire, especially the importance of the textiles industry, tracing the history of the luxury shawl industry which developed in Paisley. The museum has recreated the work and a weaving using a traditional hand loom can be seen on site It also contains an archaeological collection which includes objects from Ancient Egypt and Babylon and an extensive natural history collection, the museum also houses the local biological records centre.

One of the most important items in the Museum's collection is the Arbuthnott Missal which was presented to the Museum by another of the Coats family, Archibald. This missal is the only extant pre Reformation missal (liturgical book) of the Scottish Use and in 2007 it was awarded a prestigious top award in the British Library's Hidden Treasures Brought to Life competition.

The museum is currently closed to the public.

See also
 Museums in Scotland

References

Museums established in 1871
Natural history museums in Scotland
History museums in Scotland
Egyptological collections in Scotland
Art museums and galleries in Scotland
Museums in Renfrewshire
Buildings and structures in Paisley, Renfrewshire
Category A listed buildings in Renfrewshire
Listed museum buildings in Scotland